Fairview Township is a township in Cass County, Minnesota, United States. The population was 567 as of the 2000 census.

Geography

The west quarter of the city of East Gull Lake is located with Fairview Township geographically but is a separate entity.

Lakes
 Agate Lake (west half)
 Bass Lake
 Beauty Lake
 Burned Camp Lake
 Dead Horse Lake
 Duffney Lake
 Green Bass Lake
 Gull Lake (west quarter)
 Hardy Lake (southeast edge)
 Harlan Lake (northeast edge)
 Little Long Lake
 Long Lake
 Pillager Lake (north quarter)
 Rock Lake
 Shafer Lake
 Stump Lake
 Sylvan Lake (northwest edge)

Adjacent townships
 Home Brook Township (north)
 Sylvan Township (southeast)
 May Township (west)
 Meadow Brook Township (northwest)

Demographics
As of the census of 2000, there were 567 people, 224 households, and 180 families residing in the township.  The population density was 15.9 people per square mile (6.1/km2).  There were 410 housing units at an average density of 11.5/sq mi (4.4/km2).  The racial makeup of the township was 98.24% White, 0.35% African American, 0.18% Native American, 0.53% Asian, and 0.71% from two or more races. Hispanic or Latino of any race were 0.71% of the population.

There were 224 households, out of which 26.8% had children under the age of 18 living with them, 75.0% were married couples living together, 3.1% had a female householder with no husband present, and 19.2% were non-families. 15.2% of all households were made up of individuals, and 4.0% had someone living alone who was 65 years of age or older.  The average household size was 2.53 and the average family size was 2.77.

In the township the population was spread out, with 22.9% under the age of 18, 4.1% from 18 to 24, 21.5% from 25 to 44, 37.9% from 45 to 64, and 13.6% who were 65 years of age or older.  The median age was 46 years. For every 100 females, there were 105.4 males.  For every 100 females age 18 and over, there were 104.2 males.

The median income for a household in the township was $55,000, and the median income for a family was $64,583. Males had a median income of $35,385 versus $24,063 for females. The per capita income for the township was $29,871.  About 2.3% of families and 3.5% of the population were below the poverty line, including 2.7% of those under age 18 and 5.9% of those age 65 or over.

References
 United States National Atlas
 United States Census Bureau 2007 TIGER/Line Shapefiles
 United States Board on Geographic Names (GNIS)

Townships in Cass County, Minnesota
Brainerd, Minnesota micropolitan area
Townships in Minnesota